HR 3159 is a single star in the southern constellation of Carina, positioned near the southern constellation border with Volans. It has the Bayer designation D Carinae; HR 3159 is the Bright Star Catalogue designation. This object has a blue-white hue and is visible to the naked eye with an apparent visual magnitude of +4.81. It is located at a distance of approximately 499 light years from the Sun based on parallax, and is drifting further away with a radial velocity of 22 km/s.

This object is a B-type main-sequence star with a stellar classification of B4V, which indicates it is undergoing core hydrogen fusion. The star has a radius of nearly four times the radius of the Sun, and over six times the Sun's mass. Age estimates range from 17 up to 176 million years old, and it is spinning with a projected rotational velocity of 43 km/s. It is radiating 912 times the luminosity of the Sun from its photosphere at an effective temperature of 16,983 K.

References

B-type main-sequence stars
Carina (constellation)
Carinae, D
Durchmusterung objects
066591
039138
3159